The Daiva marriage is a righteous form of marriage. It is a form of marriage unique to the ancient Brahmins, where a man gifts his richly bedecked daughter's hand in marriage to a priest who officiates at the former's sacrifice ceremony, in lieu of paying the latter a nominal sacrificial fee. This form of a marriage, ranked as the second most meritorious, is regarded to redeem the sins of seven ascendants and descendants. It is called such because it is believed to be worthy of the devas themselves. It is featured in the Manusmriti.

Examples 
The practice was followed by many royals in ancient times to forge diplomatic ties with allies and enemies (after getting defeated) alike by giving away their daughters can also be considered as this type of marriage. Giving away of Jodhabai by her father, Raja Bharmal of Amber to Akbar and giving away of Uttara by her father, the king Virata of Matsya to Arjuna as his daughter-in-law are few of many such examples.

References

Marriage in Hinduism
Family
Social institutions
Vedic customs